Dzhirabachi (Kaitag: Жирбачӏи; Dargwa: ЖирабачӀи) is a rural locality (a selo) and the administrative centre of Dzhirabachinsky Selsoviet, Kaytagsky District, Republic of Dagestan, Russia. The population was 529 as of 2010. There are 6 streets.

Geography 
Dzhirabachi is located 16 km southwest of Madzhalis (the district's administrative centre) by road. Daknisa and Surgiya are the nearest rural localities.

Nationalities 
Dargins live there.

References 

Rural localities in Kaytagsky District